The 1972 Australian Drivers' Championship was a CAMS sanctioned Australian motor racing title open to Australian Formula 1 and Australian Formula 2 racing cars. It was the 16th Australian Drivers' Championship to be awarded by CAMS. The championship winner, Frank Matich, was awarded the 1972 CAMS Gold Star.

Calendar

The championship was contested over a six-round series with one race per round. 

An additional round, scheduled to be held at Lakeside in Queensland was cancelled.

Points system
Championship points were awarded on a 9-6-4-3-2-1 basis for the first six places in each race. Points from the best five results could be retained by each driver.

Championship results

References

Australian Drivers' Championship
Drivers' Championship